Zabih Behrouz (17 July 1890 – 12  December 1971) was an Iranian playwright and linguist. Son of the physician and calligrapher Abu’l-Fażl Sāvajī, he was born in Tehran but studied in Egypt and England. In Cambridge University he was the assistant of Edward Granville Browne, British orientalist and researcher. Behrouz came back to Iran in 1923 and a year later he started to write some plays. Jijak Alishah was one of his first plays. It was about the tyrannical monarchy of Naser al-Din Shah Qajar. His plays were mostly critical and in his plays, he criticized tyranny and hypocrisy. Behrouz usually used historical characters from the past for talking about his time. He also wrote some books about Persian language and alphabet and Iranian history.

The establishment of the Persian language academy called Farhangestan, in October 1936, occurred during Ali Asghar Hekmat’s tenure as minister of culture. The academy was at least partially inspired by the work of Zabih Behrouz in developing a pure Persian lexicon for the military.

To propagate his ideas, Behrouz founded, with the help of two of his disciples, Mohammad Moqaddam (later professor of Old Persian at the University of Tehran) and Sadeq Kia (later professor of Middle Persian and a deputy minister of culture and the arts), the «Iran-Vij Society», whose series of publications, Īrān-kūda, became the main vehicle for Behrūz’s thoughts.

Some of his plays 
 Jijak Alishah
 Iranian king and Armenian lady
 In the way of Mehr (1933)
 The night of Ferdosi
 Medicine Man

Other works 
 Persian and Arabic languages
 Grandeur religion 
 Writing system and culture
 Calendar and history in Iran
 tall boy(ebne dilagh)

References

Iranian dramatists and playwrights